Bjørn Torske (born 1971 in Tromsø, Norway) is a house music producer. He became involved with producing music and local radio before moving to Bergen, Norway. He has collaborated on many occasions with Röyksopp.

Discography

EPs
Expresso - 1998 - Ferox Records
Aerosoles - 2000 - Svek
Disco Members - 2000 - Tellé
Hard Trafikk - 2001 - Tellé
As'besto - 2006 - Sex Tags Mania (feat. Crystal Bois)
Ny Lugg (Kort Bak / Lang På Siden) - March 6, 2006 -  Smalltown Supersound
Kokt Kveite - 2007 - Smalltown Supersound
Kan Jeg Slippe? - May 28, 2008 - Sex Tags Mania

Albums
Nedi Myra - 1998 - Ferox Records
Trøbbel - 2001 - Tellé
Feil Knapp - March 26, 2007 - Smalltown Supersound
Kokning - November 2, 2010 - Smalltown Supersound
 Byen - July 6, 2018 - Smalltown Supersound

References

External links
 Official homepage
 
 

1971 births
Norwegian electronic musicians
Living people
Musicians from Tromsø
Smalltown Supersound artists